Soyutma is a Caucasian soup and Azerbaijan's national dish. It is made from lamb, onions, tomatoes and garnished with sour cream.

See also
 List of soups

References

Azerbaijani soups
National dishes